Hans Aebli (1921–1990) was a Swiss educationist, theorist, and researcher whose main focus was evolutionary psychology.

1921 births
1990 deaths
Swiss educational theorists